Sudachye is a rural locality (a selo) in Kryazhevinsky Selsoviet, Limansky District, Astrakhan Oblast, Russia. The population was 284 as of 2010. There are 4 streets.

Geography 
Sudachye is located 34 km northeast of Liman (the district's administrative centre) by road. Oranzherei is the nearest rural locality.

References 

Rural localities in Limansky District